David Stewart Ker (November 1816 – 8 October 1878) was an Irish landowner and politician.

He was a son of David Guardi Ker, MP for Athlone 1820-1826 and Downpatrick 1835-1841, and Selina Sarah, daughter of the first Marquess of Londonderry, and the elder brother of Richard Ker, Member of Parliament for Downpatrick, 1847-1851 and 1857-1859.

He was a member of the landed gentry, inheriting the estates at Montalto and Portavo, Ballynahinch on his father's death in 1844. He served as a magistrate, deputy lieutenant and High Sheriff of County Down for 1852 and High Sheriff of Antrim for 1857.

He was elected the Member of Parliament for Downpatrick, 1841-1847 and 1859-1867 and for County Down, 1852-1857.

He married twice: firstly Anna Dorothea, the daughter of Hans Blackwood, 3rd Baron Dufferin and Claneboye with whom he had 12 children and secondly Caroline Persse from Galway (who ran off with his son Charley).

He was buried in Magheradrool Church of Ireland graveyard and succeeded by his eldest son, Alfred David Ker. After his death the estates passed to another son, Richard Ker.

References

External links

1816 births
1878 deaths
UK MPs 1841–1847
UK MPs 1852–1857
UK MPs 1859–1865
UK MPs 1865–1868
Members of the Parliament of the United Kingdom for County Down constituencies (1801–1922)
Deputy Lieutenants of Down
High Sheriffs of Down
High Sheriffs of Antrim